Sixian may refer to:
Si County, Anhui Province
The Sixian dialect of Hakka Chinese